The Torneo di Viareggio, officially named the Viareggio Cup World Football Tournament Coppa Carnevale, is a youth association football tournament held annually in the commune of Viareggio, Italy and its surrounding areas. Established in 1949, the Torneo di Viareggio is considered one of the most important youth football tournaments in the world.

It coincides with the Carnival of Viareggio, starting on the third Monday of Carneval. The tournament runs for a fortnight, and finishes on the last Monday of Carnival. For this reason, it is also known as Coppa Carnevale (English: Carnival Cup).

Winners

By year

By club

Golden Boy Award 

Since 2009, the Torneo di Viareggio Golden Boy award is given to the best talent in the tournament (including goalkeepers). The player who collects the most votes by a jury composed of sports journalists accompanying the event is the winner.

The jury will be composed of: 
 Writers from Tuttosport, Gazzetta dello Sport and Corriere dello Sport.
 Editors from Il Tirreno and La Nazione.
 Journalists from RAI.
 Communications and printing directors from CGC.

Winners

External links

References 

 
Italian football friendly trophies
Youth football competitions in Italy
Sport in Viareggio